

Map 

The map data is for year 2020 from the World Bank. Numbers are in percentage.

See also

Plotted maps
European countries by electricity consumption per person
European countries by employment in agriculture (% of employed)
European countries by fossil fuel use (% of total energy)
European countries by health expense per person
European countries by percent of population aged 0-14
European countries by percentage of urban population
European countries by percentage of women in national parliaments
List of sovereign states in Europe by life expectancy
List of sovereign states in Europe by number of Internet users

References

military expenditure
Military in Europe